

The Sri Lanka Army Volunteer Force Centenary Medal was a commemorative medal awarded to all ranks of the Sri Lanka Army Volunteer Force in active service during the centenary of the force's establishment, in 1981.

References

External links
Sri Lanka Army
Sri Lanka Army Volunteer Force
Ministry of Defence : Sri Lanka

Military awards and decorations of Sri Lanka